Apni Nagariya is a 1940 Indian Hindi-language film directed by Gunjal and written by Saadat Hasan Manto. It stars Shobhana Samarth, K. N. Singh, Nazir, and Jayant.

The film was produced under the Hindustan Cinetone banner and had music composed by Rafiq Ghaznavi.

References

External links
 

1940 films
1940s Hindi-language films
Indian black-and-white films
Saadat Hasan Manto